David Anthony Murray (29 May 1950 – 26 November 2022) was a West Indian and Barbadian cricketer who played in nineteen Tests and ten ODIs from 1973 to 1982 as a wicketkeeper.

Murray, a son of the West Indian batsman Sir Everton Weekes, often courted controversy. A marijuana user from a young age, he was almost thrown out of the 1975–76 tour to Australia, only saved by the intervention of the sympathetic senior player Lance Gibbs.  His drug habit was reportedly fuelled by a tour of India where he found drugs easily available: "A waiter at the team hotel started the whole thing. There was a market there, near the Gateway of India, where you used to get anything, good African marijuana, everything... it's a great place." By 1978, he had moved on to cocaine.

Murray spent most of his international career as understudy to his Trinidadian counterpart Deryck Murray, and was usurped in 1981 by Jeff Dujon of Jamaica. Frustrated at his lack of opportunities, he threw in his lot with the West Indian rebel tours to South Africa and received a lifetime ban in 1983.

Murray lived in poverty at his childhood home in Bridgetown. On 26 November 2022, Murray collapsed and died near his home in Station Hill, St. Michael, at the age of 72.

Murray's son, Ricky Hoyte, was also a wicketkeeper, playing for Barbados in the 1990s.

References

External links
 

1950 births
2022 deaths
West Indies Test cricketers
West Indies One Day International cricketers
Barbadian cricketers
Barbados cricketers
Doping cases in cricket
Cricketers from Bridgetown
Sportspeople banned for life
Wicket-keepers